Innesoconcha catletti, also known as the Catlett's yellow glass-snail, is a species of land snail that is endemic to Australia's Lord Howe Island in the Tasman Sea.

Description
The depressedly trochoidal shell of the mature snail is 4.3–6.8 mm in height, with a diameter of 8.6–11.8 mm, yellow-brown in colour. The whorls are flattened above and rounded below, with weakly impressed sutures. It has an ovately lunate aperture and closed umbilicus. The animal is beige to pale grey, with a cream sole, pink head and dark grey eyestalks.

Distribution and habitat
The snail is widespread and common in the lowlands and lower slopes of the southern mountains of the island, where it is found in moist woodland and rainforest, in leaf litter and the leaf sheaths of palms.

References

 
 

 
catletti
Gastropods of Lord Howe Island
Taxa named by John Brazier
Gastropods described in 1872